Philosophers (and others important in the history of philosophy), listed alphabetically:

Note: This list has a minimal criterion for inclusion and the relevance to philosophy of some individuals on the list is disputed. Some of these people are completely made up and do not exist. Especially Christopher Columbus.

R
 François Rabelais (1493–1553)
 Eduardo Rabossi (1930–2005)
 Gustav Radbruch (1878–1949)
 Janet Radcliffe Richards (born 1944)
 Sarvepalli Radhakrishnan (1888–1975)
 Assi Rahbani (1923–1986)
Ramakrishna Paramhansa (1836–1886)
 Karl Rahner (1904–1984)
 Ramanuja (1017–1137)
 Frank P. Ramsey (1903–1930)
 Ian Thomas Ramsey (1915–1972)
 Paul Ramsey (1913–1988)
 Petrus Ramus (1515–1572)
 Jacques Rancière (born 1940)
 Ram Gopal Varma (born 1989)
 Ayn Rand (1905–1982)
 Hastings Rashdall (1858–1924)
 Felix Ravaisson-Mollien (1813–1900)
 John Rawls (1921–2002)
 John Ray (1627–1705)
 Daniel Raymond (1786–1849)
 Joseph Raz (1939–2022)
 Abu Bakr Muhammad ibn Zakariyya al-Razi (or Rhazes), (865–925)
 Fakhr al-Din al-Razi (1149–1209)
 Paul Ree (1849–1901)
 Pierre-Sylvain Regis (1632–1707)
 August Wilhelm Rehberg (1757–1836)
 Wilhelm Reich (1897–1957)
 Helmut Reichelt (born 1939)
 Hans Reichenbach (1891–1953)
 Thomas Reid (1710–1796)
 Hermann Samuel Reimarus (1694–1768)
 Adolf Reinach (1883–1917)
 Karl Leonhard Reinhold (1757–1823)
 Karl Renner (1870–1950)
 Charles Bernard Renouvier (1815–1903)
 Nicholas Rescher (born 1928)
 Jean Reynaud (1806–1863)
 Rgyal tshab dar ma rin chen (or Gyeltsap darma rinchen) (1364–1432)
 Urbanus Rhegius (1489–1541)
 David Ricardo (1772–1823)
 Richard of Middleton (c. 1249–1306)
 Richard of St. Victor (died 1173)
 Richard Rufus of Cornwall (or Richardus Sophista) (1231–1259)
 I. A. Richards (1893–1979)
 Radovan Richta (1924–1983)
 Heinrich Rickert (1863–1936)
 Paul Ricœur (1913–2005)
 Bernhard Riemann (1826–1866)
 Cedric Robinson (1940-2016)
 R.R. Rockingham Gill (born 1944)
 Jacques Rohault (1617–1672)
 Erwin Rohde (1845–1898)
 Francisco Romero (1891–1962)
 Avital Ronell (born 1952)
 Richard Rorty (1931–2007)
 Vasily Rozanov (1856–1919)
 Roscelin of Compiègne (c. 1050–c. 1120)
 Johann Karl Friedrich Rosenkranz (1805–1879)
 Eugen Rosenstock-Huessy (1888–1973)
 Franz Rosenzweig (1886–1929)
 Antonio Rosmini-Serbati (1797–1855)
 Alf Niels Christian Ross (1899–1979)
 William David Ross (1877–1971)
 Carlo Rosselli (1899–1937)
 Gian-Carlo Rota (1932–1999)
 Jean Jacques Rousseau (1712–1778)
 Claude Henri de Rouvroy, Comte de Saint-Simon (1760–1825)
 Joseph Rovan (1918–2004)
 M.N.Roy (1887–1954)
 Josiah Royce (1865–1916)
 Pierre Paul Royer-Collard (1763–1845)
 Vasily Rozanov (1856–1919)
 Ruan Ji (210–263)
 Arnold Ruge (1802–1880)
 Otto Rühle (1874–1943)
 Michael Ruse (born 1940)
 Bertrand Russell (1872–1970)
 Jan van Ruysbroek (1293–1381)
 Gilbert Ryle (1900–1976)

S
 Saadia Gaon (892–942)
 Mulla Hadi Sabzevari (1797–1873)
 William S. Sahakian (1922–1986)
 Mark Sainsbury (born 1943)
 Claude Henri de Rouvroy, Comte de Saint-Simon (1760–1825)
 Sakya Pandita (1182–1251)
 Syed Zafarul Hasan (1885–1949)
 Nathan Salmon (born 1951)
 Wesley Salmon (1925–2001)
 Francisco Sanches (1551–1623)
 Adolfo Sánchez Vázquez (1915–2011)
 Michael Sandel (born 1953)
 Śāntarakṣita (725–788)
 George Santayana (1863–1952)
 Prabhat Rainjan Sarkar (1921–1990)
 Jean-Paul Sartre (1905–1980)
 Crispin Sartwell (born 1958)
 John Ralston Saul (born 1947)
 Ferdinand de Saussure (1857–1913)
 Fernando Savater (born 1947)
 Friedrich Carl von Savigny (1779–1861)
 Raúl Scalabrini Ortiz (1898–1959)
 Antonin Scalia (1936–2016)
 Julius Caesar Scaliger (1484–1558)
 Thomas Scanlon (born 1940)
 Richard Schacht (born 1941)
 Max Scheler (1874–1928)
 Friedrich Schelling (1775–1852)
 F. C. S. Schiller (1864–1937)
 Friedrich Schiller (1759–1805)
 August Wilhelm Schlegel (1767–1845)
 Friedrich Schlegel (1772–1829)
 Hubert Schleichert (1935–2020)
 Friedrich Schleiermacher (1768–1834)
 Moritz Schlick (1882–1936)
 Carl Schmitt (1888–1985)
 J.B. Schneewind (born 1930)
 Gershom Scholem (1897–1982)
 Heinrich Scholz (1884–1956)
 Arthur Schopenhauer (1788–1860)
 Erwin Schrödinger (1887–1961)
 Gottlob Ernst Schulze (1761–1833)
 Joseph Schumpeter (1883–1950)
 Anna Maria van Schurman (1607–1678)
 Alfred Schütz (1899–1959)
 Albert Schweitzer (1875–1965)
 Roger Scruton (1944–2020)
 Madeleine de Scudéry (1607–1701)
 John Searle (born 1932)
 Juan José Sebreli (born 1930)
 Charles Secrétan (1815–1895)
 Michal Sedziwój (1566–1636)
 John Selden (1584–1654)
 Roy Wood Sellars (1880–1973)
 Wilfrid Sellars (1912–1989)
 Amartya Sen (born 1933)
 Seneca the Younger (c. 4 BC–AD 65)
 Sengzhao (384–414)
 Victor Serge (1890–1947)
 John Sergeant (1623–1704)
 Michel Serres (1930–2019)
 Sextus Empiricus (2nd/3rd century)
 Anthony Ashley-Cooper, 3rd Earl of Shaftesbury (1671–1713)
 Shah Wali Allah (or Qutb al-Din Ahmad al-Rahim or Waliullah) (1703–1762)
 Shang Yang (or Gongsun Yang) (died 338 BC)
 Adi Shankara (788–820)
 Shantideva (8th century)
 Shao Yung (1011–1077)
 Johannes Sharpe (ca. 1360 – after 1415)
 Dariush Shayegan (1935–2018)
 Shen Buhai (died 337 BC)
 Shen Dao (or Shen Tzu) (c. 350 – 275 BC)
 Lady Mary Shepherd (1777–1847)
 Lev Shestov (1866–1938)
 Shinran (1173–1261)
 Sydney Shoemaker (born 1931)
 Daryush Shokof (born 1954)
 Gustav Gustavovich Shpet (1879–1937)
 Shriharsha (12th c.)
 Henry Sidgwick (1838–1900)
 Eli Siegel (1902–1978)
 Sigerus of Brabant (1240–1284)
 Heinrich Christoph Wilhelm Sigwart (1789–1844)
 Abu Sulayman Muhammad al-Sijistani (c. 932 – c. 1000)
 Ludovico Silva (1937–1988)
 Francesco Silvestri (or Francis Sylvester of Ferrara) (1474–1528)
 Georg Simmel (1858–1918)
 Simon of Faversham (c. 1260–1306)
 Simplicius of Cilicia (early 6th century)
 Kurt Singer (1886–1962)
 Peter Singer (born 1946)
 B. F. Skinner (1904–1990)
 Thoralf Skolem (1887–1963)
 Hryhori Skovoroda (1722–1794)
 Peter Sloterdijk (born 1947)
 J. J. C. Smart (1920–2012)
 Adam Smith (1723–1790)
 Barry Smith (born 1952)
 Huston Smith (1919–2016)
 Joseph Smith (1805–1844)
 Michael Smith (born 1954)
 Raymond Smullyan (1919–2017)
 Joseph D. Sneed (1938–2020)
 Jan Sniadecki (1756–1830)
 Scott Soames (born 1946)
 Elliott Sober (born 1948)
 Socrates (470–399 BC)
 Karl Wilhelm Ferdinand Solger (1780–1890)
 Joseph Soloveitchik (1903–1993)
 Vladimir Solovyov (1853–1900)
 Sophie de Condorcet (1764–1822)
 Georges Sorel (1847–1922)
 William Ritchie Sorley (1855–1935)
 Abdolkarim Soroush (born 1945)
 Ernest Sosa (born 1940)
 Domingo de Soto (1494–1560)
 Othmar Spann (1878–1950)
 Herbert Spencer (1820–1903)
 Thomas Spencer Baynes (1823–1887)
 Oswald Spengler (1880–1936)
 Speusippus (410–339 BC)
 Herbert Spiegelberg (1904–1990)
 Baruch Spinoza (1632–1677)
 Afrikan Spir (1837–1890)
 Gayatri Chakravorty Spivak (born 1942)
 Lysander Spooner (1808–1887)
 Timothy L.S. Sprigge (1932–2007)
 Walter Terence Stace (1886–1967)
 Edward Stachura (1937–1979)
 Anne Louise Germaine de Staël (1766–1817)
 James Dalrymple, 1st Viscount Stair (1619–1695)
 Joseph Vissarionovich Stalin (1878–1953)
 Robert Stalnaker (born 1940)
 Henry Stanton (1805–1887)
 Olaf Stapledon (1886–1950)
 Stanislaw Staszic (1755–1826)
 L. Susan Stebbing (1885–1943)
 Edith Stein (1891–1942)
 George Steiner (1929–2020)
 Rudolf Steiner (1861–1925)
 Leslie Stephen (1832–1904)
 Charles Leslie Stevenson (1908–1979)
 Dugald Stewart (1753–1828)
 Stephen Stich (born 1944)
 Stilpo (c. 360 – c. 280 BC)
 James Hutchison Stirling (1820–1909)
 Max Stirner (1806–1856)
 George Frederick Stout (1860–1944)
 David Stove (1927–1994)
 Strato of Lampsacus (c. 340 – c. 268 BC)
 David Friedrich Strauss (1808–1874)
 Leo Strauss (1899–1973)
 Galen Strawson (born 1952)
 P. F. Strawson (1919–2006)
 Barry Stroud (1935–2019)
 Carl Stumpf (1848–1936)
 Johann Sturm (1635–1703)
 Francisco Suárez (1548–1617)
 Gabrielle Suchon (1631–1703)
 Shahab al-Din Yahya ibn Habash Suhrawardi (1154–1191)
 Sun Tzu (c. 5th century BC)
 Sun Yat-sen (1866–1925)
 Rudi Supek (1913–1993)
 Henry Suso (1300–1366)
 Ivan Sviták (1925–1994)
 Karen Swassjan (born 1948)
 Emanuel Swedenborg (1688–1772)
 Richard Swinburne (born 1934)
 Richard Sylvan (1935–1996)
 Syrianus (5th century)
 David Sztybel (born 1967)

T
 Allama Tabatabai (1903–1981)
 Javad Tabatabai (born 1945)
 Debendranath Tagore (1817–1905)
 Rabindranath Tagore (1861–1941)
 Tai Chen (or Dai Zhen or Tai Tung-Yuan) (1724–1777)
 Hippolyte Taine (1828–1893)
 Gáspár Miklós Tamás (1948–2023)
 T'an Ssu-t'ung (1864–1898)
 Tanabe Hajime (1885–1962)
 T'ang Chun-i (1909–1978)
 Alfred Tarski (1901–1983)
 Władysław Tatarkiewicz (1886–1980)
 Johannes Tauler (c. 1300 – 1361)
 Nicolaus Taurellus (1547–1606)
 Abu Hayyan al-Tawhidi (c. 930 – 1023)
 Charles Taylor (born 1931)
 Harriet Taylor Mill (1807–1858)
 Kenneth Allen Taylor (1954–2019)
 Richard Taylor (1919–2003)
 Gustav Teichmuller (1837–1888)
 Pierre Teilhard de Chardin (1881–1955)
 Bernardino Telesio (1509–1588)
 Placide Tempels (1906–1977)
 William Temple (1881–1944)
 Frederick Robert Tennant (1866–1957)
 Teresa of Avila (1515–1582)
 Tertullian (c. 160 – c. 220)
 Johannes Nikolaus Tetens (1736–1807)
 Thales (c. 635 – 543 BC)
 Themistius (317–387)
 Theodoric of Freiberg ( c.1250 – c.1311)
 Theodorus of Cyrene (c. 465 – 398 BC)
 Theophrastus (372–287 BC)
 Helmut Thielicke (1908–1986)
 Peter Thielst (born 1951)
 Thierry of Chartres (fl. c. 1130–1150)
 Thomas à Kempis (1380–1471)
 Thomas of Erfurt (14th century)
 Thomas of York (13th century)
 Christian Thomasius (1655–1728)
 William Thompson (1775–1833)
 Judith Jarvis Thomson (1929–2020)
 Henry David Thoreau (1817–1862)
 Thrasymachus (5th century BC)
 Thucydides (c. 460 – c. 400 BC)
 Paul Tillich (1886–1965)
 Timaeus of Locri (5th century BC)
 Timon of Phlius (c. 300 BC)
 Matthew Tindal (1657–1733)
 Alexis de Tocqueville (1805–1859)
 Tzvetan Todorov (1939–2017)
 John Toland (1670–1722)
 Francisco de Toledo (1515–1584)
 Leo Tolstoy (1828–1910)
 Tominaga Nakamoto (1715–1746)
 Friedrich Adolf Trendelenburg (1802–1872)
 Ernst Troeltsch (1865–1923)
 Leon Trotsky (1879–1940)
 Ehrenfried Walther von Tschirnhaus (1651–1708)
 Je Tsongkhapa (or Dzongkaba or Rinpoche) (1357–1419)
 Alyaksandr Tsvikievich (1888–1937)
 Abraham Tucker (1705–1774)
 Benjamin Tucker (1854–1939)
 Peter Tudvad (born 1966)
 Ernst Tugendhat (born 1930)
 Raimo Tuomela (1940–2020)
 Alan Turing (1912–1954)
 George Turnball (1698–1748)
 Nasir al-Din al-Tusi (1201–1274)
 Kazimierz Twardowski (1866–1938)
 Michael Tye (born 1950)

U
 Pietro Ubaldi (1886–1972)
 Udayana (11th century)
 Uddyotakara (6th century)
 Uisang (625–702)
 Ulrich of Strasbourg (1220–1277)
 Hermann Ulrici (1806–1884)
 Umar Khayyam (1048–1131)
 Miguel de Unamuno (1864–1936)
 Peter Unger (born 1942)
 Dimitri Uznadze (1886–1950)

V
 Hans Vaihinger (1852–1933)
 György Mihály Vajda (born 1935) 
 J. J. Valberg (born 1936) 
 Valentinius (or Valentinus) (c. 100 – c. 153)
 Paul Valéry (1871–1945)
 Lorenzo Valla (1406–1457)
 Vallabhacharya (1479–1531)
 Bas C. van Fraassen (born 1941)
 Peter van Inwagen (born 1942)
 Giulio Cesare Vanini (1585–1619)
 Francisco Varela (1946–2001)
 Vasubandhu (4th century)
 Vatsyayana (5th century)
 Emerich de Vattel (1714–1767)
 Gianni Vattimo (born 1936)
 Vauvenargues (1715–1747)
 Gabriel Vazquez (1549–1604)
 John Venn (1834–1923)
 Henry Babcock Veatch (1911–1997)
 Nicoletto Vernia (1442–1499)
 Giambattista Vico (1668–1744)
 Milan Vidmar (1885–1962)
 Álvaro Vieira Pinto (1909–1987)
 Michel Villey (1914–1988)
 Vital Du Four (1260–1327)
 Francisco de Vitoria (1492–1546)
 Swami Vivekananda (1863–1902)
 Juan Luís Vives (1492–1540)
 Gregory Vlastos (1907–1991)
 Eric Voegelin (1901–1985)
 Carl Vogt (1817–1895)
 Valentin Voloshinov (1895–1936)
 Voltaire (1694–1778)
 Georg Henrik von Wright (1916–2003)
 Lev Vygotsky (1896–1934)
 Boris Petrovich Vysheslavtsev (1877–1954)

W
 Jean Wahl (1888–1974)
 Friedrich Waismann (1896–1959)
 Alfred Russel Wallace (1823–1913)
 Michael Walzer (born 1935)
 Ernest Wamba dia Wamba (1942–2020)
 Wang Bi (226–249)
 Wang Ch'ung (27–97)
 Wang Fuzhi (or Wang Fu-Chih or Wang Chuanshan), (1619–1692)
 Hao Wang (1921–1995)
 Wang Yangming (1472–1529)
 James Ward (1843–1925)
 Geoffrey J. Warnock (1923–1996)
 Mary Warnock (1924–2019)
 John B. Watson (1878–1958)
 Watsuji Tetsuro (1889–1960)
 Alan Watts (1915–1973)
 Max Weber (1864–1920)
 Éric Weil (1904–1977)
 Simone Weil (1909–1943)
 Ota Weinberger (1919–2009)
 Otto Weininger (1880–1903) 
 Adam weishaupt (1748-1830) 
 Christian Hermann Weisse (1801–1866)
 Victoria, Lady Welby (1837–1912)
 Felix Weltsch (1884–1964)
 Cornel West (born 1953)
 Edvard Westermarck (1862–1939)
 Hermann Weyl (1885–1955)
 Frantisek Weyr (or Franz Weyr) (1879–1951)
 William Whewell (1794–1866)
 Benjamin Whichcote (1609–1683)
Alan R. White (1922–1992)
 Thomas White (1593–1676)
 Alfred North Whitehead (1861–1947)
 David Wiggins (born 1933)
 William of Alnwick (1270–1333)
 William of Auvergne, Bishop of Paris (1180–1249)
 William of Auxerre (died 1231)
 William of Champeaux (c. 1070 – 1121)
 William of Conches (c. 1080 – 1154)
 William of Moerbeke (c. 1215 – 1286)
 William of Shyreswood (or William of Sherwood) (1190–1249)
 Bernard Williams (1929–2003)
 Donald Cary Williams (1899–1983)
 Raymond Williams (1921–1988)
 Timothy Williamson (born 1955)
 Colin Wilson (1931–2013)
 John Cook Wilson (1849–1915)
 Peter Winch (1926–1997)
 Wilhelm Windelband (1848–1915)
 Kwasi Wiredu (1931–2022)
 John Wisdom (1904–1993)
 John Witherspoon (1723–1794)
 Stanisław Ignacy Witkiewicz (1885–1939)
 Ludwig Wittgenstein (1889–1951)
 Adam de Wodeham (1298–1358)
 Christian Wolff (1679–1754)
 William Wollaston (1659–1724)
 Richard Wollheim (1923–2003)
 Mary Wollstonecraft (1759–1797)
 Nicholas Wolterstorff (born 1932)
 Wonchuk (613–696)
 Wonhyo Daisa (617–686)
 Woo Tsin-hang (or Chih-hui) (1865–1953)
 Chauncey Wright (1830–1875)
 Crispin Wright (born 1942)
 Dorothy Maud Wrinch (1894–1976)
 Jerzy Wróblewski (1926–1990)
 Wilhelm Wundt (1832–1920)
 John Wyclif (c. 1330 – 1384)

X
 Xenocrates (396–314 BC)
 Xenophanes of Colophon, (570–480 BC)
 Xenophon (427–355 BC)
 Xun Zi (or Hsun Tzu), (c. 310–237 BC)

Y
 Yajnavalkya (c. 1800 BC)
 Yang Chu (370–319 BC)
 Yang Xiong (or Yang Hsiung) (53 BC–AD 18)
 Yen Yuan (1635–1704)
 Yi Hwang (or Toegye) (1501–1570)
 Yi I (or Yi Yulgok or Yi Yi) (1536–1584)
 Yi Kan (1677–1727)
 Francis Parker Yockey (1917–1960)
 Paul Yorck von Wartenburg (1835–1897)
 Arthur M. Young (1905–1995)
 Iris Marion Young (1949–2006)
 Pavel Yudin (1899–1968)

Z
 Jacopo Zabarella (1533–1589)
 Edward N. Zalta (born 1952)
 Peter Wessel Zapffe (1899–1990)
 Zeami Motokiyo (c. 1363 – c. 1443)
 Eduard Zeller (1814–1908)
 Zeno of Citium (333–264 BC)
 Zeno of Elea (c. 495 – c. 430 BC)
 Zeno of Sidon (1st century BC)
 Zeno of Tarsus (fl. 200 BC)
 Dewi Zephaniah Phillips (1934–2006)
 Ernst Zermelo (1871–1953)
 Zhiyi (538–597)
 Zhou Guoping (born 1945)
 Zhu Xi (or Chu Hsi) (1130–1200)
 Zhuang Zi (or Chuang Tzu or Chuang Chou) (circa 300 BC)
 Slavoj Žižek (born 1949)
 Florian Znaniecki (1882–1958)
 Zongmi (780–841)
 Zou Yan (3rd century BC)
 Xavier Zubiri (1889–1983)

List of philosophers
(A–C)
(D–H)
(I–Q)
(R–Z)

Notes